The Ministry of Foreign Affairs is the government ministry responsible for representing Laos to the international community. The ministry oversees the foreign relations of Laos, maintains diplomatic missions in other countries, and provides visa services.

 the Minister of Foreign Affairs was Saleumxay Kommasith. The Ministry's main offices are located in Vientiane.

Organization
Departments of the Ministry include:
Personnel and Staff Department
Asia, Pacific and Africa Department 
Europe and America Department
ASEAN Department
Economic Affairs Department
International Organizations Department
Law and Treaties Department 
Protocol Department
Press Department
Consular Department
Economic Department
Overseas Lao Affairs Department  
Institute of Foreign Affairs Department
Diplomatic Service Bureau Department
The Office of the National Boundary Committee

e-Visa system

Since July 2019, an e-Visa system has been launched by the Ministry of Foreign Affairs, which enables visitors to apply for a Laos tourist visa online. Instead of applying through the Laotian Embassy, all that is needed to be done is to complete the online application form and pay with a credit card. After receiving the Visa through email, it should be printed and brought along when traveling to Laos. Tourists can apply for an online visa to Laos at the official website.

List of ministers

This is a list of Ministers of Foreign Affairs of Laos:

See also
Politics of Laos
Foreign relations of Laos

External links 
  Ministry of Foreign Affairs

References

Ministries of the Government of Laos
Foreign relations of Laos
Laos
Vientiane